Kurt Cobain Memorial Park (also called Kurt Cobain Landing) is a park in Aberdeen, Washington and the first official, full-scale memorial to Nirvana frontman Kurt Cobain in his hometown.

A welcome sign to the city installed in 2005 which obliquely says "Come As You Are", but does not mention Cobain by name, was the first official recognition of the musician. The Memorial Park, initially built in Felony Flats on city-owned land near his Aberdeen home in 2011, and maintained by local volunteers as Kurt Cobain Landing, was adopted by the city of Aberdeen in 2015, 21 years after his death. As recently as 2011, a motion not to rename the adjacent Young Street Bridge after Cobain was applauded at a city council meeting.

The lyrics of the Nirvana song "Something in the Way" are about the Young Street Bridge. The lyrics to the song are etched on an aluminum plaque posted in the park.

A granite memorial headstone inscribed with Cobain quotes rests in the park. Part of one of the quotes was sandblasted away because the city mayor found the phrase "[drugs] will fuck you up" offensive.

See also

Viretta Park, a city park with an unofficial memorial to Cobain near his Seattle home

References

External links

 at Aberdeen Parks Dept.
Young Street Bridge field recording, Steven Rowell, 2015 at the Internet Archive
Kurt Cobain Memorial Park, Roadtrippers

2011 establishments in Washington (state)
Aberdeen, Washington
Granite sculptures in Washington (state)
Kurt Cobain
Monuments and memorials in Washington (state)
Parks in Grays Harbor County, Washington
Protected areas established in 2011